International Pop Overthrow is the debut studio album by Material Issue, released on Mercury Records on February 5, 1991. The album was recorded in multiple recording sessions between 1988 and 1991, with the total recording costs reaching only $5,000. Mercury Records only expected the record to sell about 70,000 copies. However, it initially sold about 180,000 copies, with final sales exceeding 300,000.  It reached #86 on the Billboard 200 album chart.  The album was produced by Jeff Murphy, guitarist/vocalist for the band Shoes, at the Shoes' Short Order Recorder studio, in Zion, Illinois.

On April 5, 2011, the 20th Anniversary Edition was released, which included early singles and live tracks.

The International Pop Overthrow music festival was named in honor of this album.

Track listing
All songs written by Jim Ellison.
"Valerie Loves Me" - 3:05
"Diane" - 2:55
"Renee Remains The Same" - 3:16
"This Letter" - 4:21
"Out Right Now" - 2:03
"Crazy" - 3:34
"Chance Of A Lifetime" - 3:03
"International Pop Overthrow" - 2:29
"Very First Lie" - 3:30
"Trouble" - 3:18
"There Was A Few" - 3:23
"This Far Before" - 2:46
"A Very Good Idea" - 3:53
"Li'l Christine" - 3:21

Singles
Three songs from the album were released as singles:
"Renee Remains The Same"
"Valerie Loves Me"
"Diane"

Reception

 "Anyone who was looking for the future of power pop in 1991 might well have imagined these guys were it, and not without reason -- International Pop Overthrow is smart, hooky, and not afraid to sound edgy or let the amps go into the red." (Mark Deming, AllMusic) 
 "Though power pop (a.k.a. "the skinny-tie era") was the rage in New York and Los Angeles for only a brief time at the start of the '80s, that style of melodic rock has survived in the Midwest for two decades thanks to practitioners such as Cheap Trick, the Raspberries, Shoes and the Romantics. The band next poised to pop till they drop is Chicago's Material Issue, whose major-label debut has just been released by Mercury." (Michael Corcoran, Chicago Sun-Times) 
 "International Pop Overthrow is smart, hooky, and not afraid to sound edgy or let the amps go into the red." (Mark Deming, Rolling Stone) 
 "Their 1991 major-label debut, "International Pop Overthrow," paid delightful homage to girls, cars and power pop chords. At least seven of the cuts on the album were strong enough to be hit singles. Radio loved "Diane" and "Valerie Loves Me" the most." (Jae-Ha Kim, Chicago Sun-Times) 
 "MATERIAL ISSUE could be the big college radio rave of the spring, thanks to the parade of perky tunes about girls they loved and lost on their new debut album, "International Pop Overthrow." Weaned on Cheap Trick, Shoes and other legends of Midwestern power pop in the late '70s, this Chicago trio lives, eats and breathes three-minute singles." (Dale Anderson, The Buffalo News)

Personnel
Jim Ellison - vocals, guitar
Ted Ansani - bass, vocals
Mike Zelenko - drums

References

External links
 - 20th Anniversary Edition

1991 debut albums
Mercury Records albums
Material Issue albums